The Noluskatsi River is a river in northeastern Kenora District in northwestern Ontario, Canada. It is in the James Bay drainage basin and is a right tributary of the Kapiskau River.

The Noluskatsi River begins at an unnamed lake and flows east and then north to its mouth at the Kapiskau River, which flows to James Bay.

References

Sources

"Noluskatsi River" at Atlas of Canada. Accessed 2016-04-24.

Rivers of Kenora District